The Piscinola Scampia station is a station on the Naples-Aversa regional underground line (also known as Line 11) managed by the EAV. The station is made up of two levels: in the upper one there are the platforms of the Piscinola station of Line 1 of the Naples Metro, while in the lower one there are the platforms of the station of the Line 11.

Services 
The station has:

  Ticket office
  Escalators
  Elevator
  Accessibility for the handicapped
  Toilet

References 

Railway stations in Naples
Railway stations opened in 2005
Railway stations in Italy opened in the 21st century